Eagle Lake is a lake in Kenora District, Ontario, Canada, west of the City of Dryden. The communities of Vermilion Bay and Eagle Lake First Nation are located on the lake's north shore.

Substantial islands in the lake include Staton Island, North Twin Island, South Twin Island, Net Island, Float Island, Boat Island, and Canoe Island.

See also
List of lakes in Ontario

References

Lakes of Kenora District